Asphalt is an unincorporated community located in Edmonson County, Kentucky, United States.

Geography
Asphalt is located west of Brownsville and it is served by Kentucky Route 655 (Segal Road) off of KY 70.

Sites of interest
The Mathias Willis Store House is located near Asphalt at the end of Salvage Road (formerly Cummins Road). It was a mid-19th century store building that served customers traveling along the Green River, which flows just south of the area. In 1987, it was listed in the National Register of Historic Places.

Churches
Asphalt is the home to the Asphalt Church of Christ (formerly New Liberty Church), one of Edmonson County's several places of worship. Their Gospel Meetings, or revivals, are usually held in mid-June.

In the week of June 7–10, 2015, the Asphalt Church celebrated their 140th anniversary, meaning that the church was believed to be established in 1875. According to the previous week's edition of the Edmonson News and the congregational members of the church, the church at its original location was burned down sometime in 1951 due to a faulty wiring. The church received its current name after being rebuilt at its current location in 1952. The church originally stood at the current location of the New Liberty Cemetery. In spite of the church's name change, Edmonson County road maps dating from the 1940s to 1977 still list it as the New Liberty Church.

Education
Students in Asphalt attend Edmonson County Schools, including the Edmonson County High School, in Brownsville. At one time Asphalt was served by their own school until the 1959-60 merger of all of Edmonson County's high schools in other communities. The Asphalt School building is still standing, but not in the condition to be used.

Postal service
Asphalt does not currently have a post office, so 42210, Brownsville's zip code is used. The Asphalt post office originally operated until its closing in 1958. The closing of the post office predated the introduction of the zip code system by several years.

References

Unincorporated communities in Edmonson County, Kentucky
Unincorporated communities in Kentucky